Peggy McGaugh is an American politician. She is a Republican representing District 7 in the Missouri House of Representatives.

Political career 

McGaugh was County Clerk in Carroll County, Missouri from 1985 to 2018.

In February 2018, McGaugh ran in a special election to replace her son, Joe Don McGaugh, as the District 39 representative in the Missouri House of Representatives. She defeated Democrat Ethan Perkinson with 35.7% of the vote. In November 2018, she won election to a full term, and was reelected to a second full term in 2020. Redistricting in 2022 placed her home in District 7 instead of 39, so she was reelected to a third term there.

As of June 2020, McGaugh sits on the following committees:
 Elections and Elected Officials
 Local Government

Electoral record

References 

Living people
Republican Party members of the Missouri House of Representatives
Year of birth missing (living people)
21st-century American politicians
Women state legislators in Missouri
21st-century American women politicians